The 2012 African Women's Handball Champions League was the 34th edition, organized by the African Handball Confederation, under the auspices of the International Handball Federation, the handball sport governing body. The tournament was held from November 16–24 in Tangier, Morocco, contested by 11 teams and won by Atlético Petróleos de Luanda of Angola.

Draw

Preliminary round

Times given below are in WET UTC+0.

Group A

* Note:  Advance to quarter-finals Relegated to 9th place classification

Group B

* Note:  Advance to quarter-finals Relegated to 9th place classification

Knockout stage
Championship bracket

5-8th bracket

9th place

Final ranking

See also
 2014 African Handball Championship

References

External links
 Official website

African Women's Handball Champions League
African Women's Handball Champions League
African Women's Handball Champions League
2012 Africa Women's Handball Champions League
International handball competitions hosted by Morocco